Diona is an unincorporated community in Coles County, Illinois, United States.

History
A post office was established at Diona in 1869, and remained in operation until 1902. The etymology of the name Diona is uncertain.

References

Unincorporated communities in Coles County, Illinois
Unincorporated communities in Illinois